Dominique Villars or Villar (born 14 November 1745 in Le Villard, part of the commune of Le Noyer, Hautes-Alpes, and died on 26 June 1814 in Strasbourg) was an 18th-century French botanist.

His main work is Histoire des plantes du Dauphiné published between 1786 and 1789, in which about 2,700 species (particularly alpine plants) are described, after over twenty years of observation in the Dauphiné region of southeastern France. His herbarium and botanical manuscripts are preserved at the Muséum d'histoire naturelle de Grenoble.

References

 Benoît Dayrat (2003). Les Botanistes et la Flore de France. Trois siècles de découvertes, scientific magazine of the Muséum national d'histoire naturelle : 690 p.

External links
  "Un Dauphinois mal connu : Dominique Villars", by Henri Chollat
  "L'histoire des plantes de Dauphiné", by D. Villars

1745 births
1814 deaths
19th-century French botanists
People from Hautes-Alpes
18th-century French botanists